Bjarne Rønning (born 25 October 1953) is a Norwegian children's writer. He made his literary début in 1977 with the children's book Bjarne Huldasons sjøreise, for which he was awarded the Tarjei Vesaas' debutantpris. He is also known as a football player and has coached Lyn and Skeid.

References

1953 births
Living people
Norwegian children's writers
Norwegian footballers
Norwegian football managers
Skeid Fotball managers
Association football midfielders